Michael McCormack Lafferty (born May 20, 1948) is a former World Cup alpine ski racer from the United States. He specialized in downhill and  had two World Cup podiums and eleven top ten finishes, all in downhill. His best finish in the World Cup season standings was in 1972: third in downhill and ninth overall.

Early years
Born in Eugene, Oregon, Lafferty was the third and youngest son of Paul and Jean Lafferty. His father Paul (1910–92) was a college ski team coach in the 1930s and an officer in the famed 10th Mountain Division of the U.S. Army in World War II.

Lafferty learned to ski at Willamette Pass and raced as a junior for the Bend Skyliners at Mt. Bachelor. Following graduation from South Eugene High School in 1966, he followed his brother Peter to the University of Colorado in Boulder. He raced for the Buffaloes for two years until named to the "B team" of the U.S. Ski Team in December 1968, then promoted to the "A team" later that month.

Racing career
Lafferty's first top ten result in a World Cup race was in December 1969, with a fifth place in a downhill at Val-d'Isère, France. At the Winter Olympics in 1972 in Japan, Lafferty finished 14th in the downhill. Two years earlier, he was 31st at the World Championships in 1970 in Italy.

Lafferty's best World Cup result was his first podium, a runner-up finish at Crystal Mountain, Washington, in February 1972, the first event after the Olympics. The next day he had a fourth-place finish in another downhill and ascended another podium in Italy a few weeks later. Before the Olympics, he finished just off the podium in mid-January with a fourth place at storied Kitzbühel.

His third-place finish in the World Cup downhill season standings in 1972 was the best by an American male until 2003, when Daron Rahlves finished second. (Other third-place finishers were Bill Johnson in 1984 and A.J. Kitt in 1992.) Rahlves finished second again in 2004 and Bode Miller was also second in 2005 and 2008. Through 2014, a U.S. male has yet to win the season title in the downhill discipline.

After racing
Following his final season in 1974, Lafferty returned to Oregon to help manage the family's successful cold storage business in Eugene and Albany. He briefly raced on the pro circuit in North America.

World Cup results

Season standings

Points were only awarded for top ten finishes (see scoring system).

Top ten finishes
 2 podiums - (2 DH)
 11 top tens - (11 DH)

References

External links
 
 Mike Lafferty World Cup standings at the International Ski Federation
 
 
 University of Colorado Olympians – 1972 Sapporo – alpine skiing – Michael Lafferty
 Sno Temp – about us
 Getty Images – 1972 Winter Olympics – alpine skiing – Mike Lafferty

1948 births
Living people
American male alpine skiers
Olympic alpine skiers of the United States
Alpine skiers at the 1972 Winter Olympics
Sportspeople from Eugene, Oregon
20th-century American people